Willet Babcock, a cabinetmaker, alderman, fireman, and opera house proprietor in Paris, Texas, commissioned the life-sized sculpture of a man wearing cowboy boots that was placed on his own grave.

Biography
Originally from Ithaca, New York, born there in October 1828 according to the gravestone monument that he commissioned, Babcock moved to Paris in the 1850s, where he set up shop with A. A. Walker on South Main Street as a craftsman and furniture dealer, and was instrumental in Paris becoming a centre for furniture manufacturing.
The factory adopted steam powered machinery in 1875.
He was furthermore involved in many other parts of Paris life, being its first alderman and fire chief, running the Babcock Opera House above his second furniture showroom (the Masonic Hall on the corner of Main Street and Kauffman that he purchased in 1863), and as a company director of the Paris Street Railroad Company and the Paris Gas Light Company.

He was also, as many cabinetmakers were, involved in undertaking.
By the end of his life a wealthy man, he died on August 27, 1881, having the year before commissioned the stone monument for his own grave, the Willet Babcock Memorial, from the Paris Marble Works.
A life-sized statue of a man on a pedestal between two inverted torches, posed leaning against a cross and wearing cowboy boots, it was carved by German immigrant stonemason Gustav Klein, who worked for the Marble Works and whose work can be found at other gravesites in the cemetery where Babcock is buried.

References

Sources

Further reading 

 
  — detail of the boots

1828 births
1881 deaths